Ri Jun-Il (Hanja: 李俊一,, born 24 August 1987) is a North Korean professional footballer who currently plays as a defender for Sobaeksu in DPR Korea League.

Club career
Since 2008, Ri Jun-Il plays for Sobaeksu in the DPR Korea League.

International career
Ri has been a part of the National team since 2008, and has won 36 caps, scoring no goal. He is also part of the Korean defence that qualified for the 2010 FIFA World Cup in South Africa. He played an integral part of the North Korea team that qualified for the 2010 FIFA World Cup in South Africa.

References

Ri Jun-il at DPRKFootball

1987 births
Living people
Sportspeople from Pyongyang 
North Korean footballers
North Korea international footballers
2010 FIFA World Cup players
2011 AFC Asian Cup players
Footballers at the 2006 Asian Games
Footballers at the 2010 Asian Games
Association football defenders
Asian Games competitors for North Korea